Mario Sassi (died 1615) was a Roman Catholic prelate who served as Archbishop of Rossano (1612–1615).

Biography
On 26 November 1612, Mario Sassi was appointed during the papacy of Pope Paul V as Archbishop of Rossano. On 9 December 1612, he was consecrated bishop by Fabrizio Verallo, Bishop of San Severo, with Antonio d'Aquino, Bishop of Sarno, and Francesco Cennini de' Salamandri, Bishop of Amelia, serving as co-consecrators. He served as Archbishop of Rossano until his death on 9 January 1615.

References

External links and additional sources
 (for Chronology of Bishops)
 (for Chronology of Bishops)

17th-century Italian Roman Catholic archbishops
Bishops appointed by Pope Paul V
1615 deaths